The 2007–08 National League A season, was the first ice hockey season of the National League A since the reorganization of the Swiss league and the 70th in the history of Swiss professional hockey. There were some rule changes to the standings and playoff format and the league officially changed its name to National League A.

Regular season

Playoffs

Relegation

EHC Biel, champions of the National League B, would later defeat EHC Basel Sharks, 4–0 to move up into the National League A. Therefore, Basel was relegated to the National League B.

References
sehv.ch

External links
hockeyfans.ch
LNA Regular Season 2007-2008

1
Swiss